LoveScream is the first EP by Korean hip hop group Epik High, released on September 30, 2008.

Track listings
1. Butterfly Effect
2. Fallin' (featuring Jo Yejin [조예진] of Lucite Tokki [루싸이트 토끼])
3. Harajuku Days
4. 습관 (Habit) (featuring 하동균 of Wanted)
5. 쉿 (Shh)
6. 1분 1초 (1 Minute, 1 Second) (featuring 타루)
7. 1825 (Paper Cranes)

External links
  Epik High's Official Site

Epik High albums
2008 debut EPs
Korean-language EPs
Woollim Entertainment EPs